This article does not include the franchise's first eleven years (1961–1971), as the Washington Senators.

This is a list of award winners and league leaders for the Texas Rangers baseball team.

Key

Baseball Hall of Famers

Ten Rangers have been inducted in the National Baseball Hall of Fame and Museum.

Awards

Most Valuable Player

Five Rangers have won the Major League Baseball Most Valuable Player Award.

Rookie of the Year

Two Rangers have won the Major League Baseball Rookie of the Year Award.

Manager of the Year

Three Rangers have won the Major League Baseball Manager of the Year Award.

Gold Glove Award

Twelve Rangers have won the Gold Glove Award, which includes seven multi-time winners. Cumulatively, the Rangers have won four 4 at pitcher, 16 at catcher, 4 at first base, 9 at third base, 3 at shortstop, and 2 at outfield for a total of 38 Gold Gloves.

Platinum Glove Award

One Ranger has won the Platinum Glove Award.

Wilson Defensive Player of the Year Award

Three Rangers have won the Wilson Defensive Player of the Year Award.

Silver Slugger Award

DH
Al Oliver (1981)
Rafael Palmeiro (1999)
Vladimir Guerrero (2010)
Catcher
Iván Rodríguez [6] (1994–99)
First baseman
Mark Teixeira [2] (2004–05)
Nathaniel Lowe (2022)
Second baseman
Julio Franco [3] (1989–91)
Alfonso Soriano [2] (2004–05)
Third baseman
Buddy Bell (1984)
Adrian Beltre [2] (2011, 2014)
Shortstop
Alex Rodriguez [3] (2001–03)
Outfielders
Al Oliver (1980)
Rubén Sierra (1989)
Juan González [5] (1992–93, 1996–98)
Josh Hamilton (2010)

Hank Aaron Award

One Ranger has won the Hank Aaron Award.

Edgar Martínez Award

Two Rangers have won the Edgar Martínez Award, formerly known as the Outstanding Designated Hitter Award.

Rolaids Relief Man of the Year Award

See footnote
Jim Kern (1979)
Jeff Russell (1989)

The Sporting News Comeback Player of the Year
See footnote below
1974 – Ferguson Jenkins
 – José Guzmán
 – Kevin Elster
 – Rubén Sierra

MLB "This Year in Baseball Awards"
See: This Year in Baseball Awards#Award winners
Note: Voted by five groups as the best in all of Major League Baseball (i.e., not two awards, one for each league).
Note: These awards were renamed the "GIBBY Awards" (Greatness in Baseball Yearly) in 2010 and then the "Esurance MLB Awards" in 2015.

"This Year in Baseball Awards" Player of the Year
Josh Hamilton (2010)

"This Year in Baseball Awards" Defensive Player of the Year
Elvis Andrus (2010)

"Esurance MLB Awards" Best Bounceback Player
Prince Fielder (2015)

Ted Williams MVP Award (All-Star Game)
Julio Franco
Alfonso Soriano (2004)
Michael Young (2006)
Josh Hamilton (2010)

All-Star Game — Home Run Derby champion
Juan González
Josh Hamilton (2010)

DHL Hometown Heroes (2006)
Nolan Ryan — voted by MLB fans as the most outstanding player in the history of the franchise, based on on-field performance, leadership quality and character value

Baseball Prospectus Internet Baseball Awards AL Most Valuable Player
See: Baseball Prospectus#Internet Baseball Awards
Josh Hamilton (2010)

USA Today AL Most Valuable Player
Josh Hamilton (2010)

Topps All-Star Rookie teams

1974: Mike Hargrove
1977: Bump Wills
1979: Pat Putnam, Billy Sample
1985: Oddibe McDowell
1986: Pete Incaviglia
1988: Cecil Espy
1990: Jeff Huson
1991: Iván Rodríguez
2000: Mike Lamb
2003: Mark Teixeira
2008: David Murphy
2009: Elvis Andrus

MLB Insiders Club Magazine All-Postseason Team
2011 – Mike Napoli (C), Nelson Cruz (OF; one of three), Derek Holland (SP; one of three)

Associated Press Manager of the Year Award
See footnote
Billy Martin (1974)

Baseball Prospectus Internet Baseball Awards AL Manager of the Year
See: Baseball Prospectus#Internet Baseball Awards
See footnote
Ron Washington (2010)

USA Today AL Manager of the Year
See footnote
Ron Washington (2010)

The Sporting News Executive of the Year Award

Doug Melvin (1996)

Baseball America Major League Executive of the Year
See: Baseball America Major League Executive of the Year
Jon Daniels (2010)

Team award
 – Baseball America Organization of the Year
 – William Harridge Trophy (American League champion)
 – William Harridge Trophy (American League champion)

Minor league system

Tom Grieve Minor League Player of the Year

Nolan Ryan Minor League Pitcher of the Year

Minor League Defender of the Year

Minor League Reliever of the Year

True Ranger Award

The True Ranger Award recognizes "players who represent the core values of the organization in a positive light both on and off the field."

International Senior Athlete of the Year
 – Justin Smoak (Triple-A Oklahoma City)

Other achievements

Texas Rangers Hall of Fame
See Texas Rangers (baseball)#Texas Rangers Hall of Fame

Retired numbers
See Texas Rangers (baseball)#Retired numbers

American League statistical leaders

A.L. Batting Title
Julio Franco, 1991
Michael Young, 2005
Josh Hamilton, 2010

A.L. Home Run Champ
Frank Howard, 1968, 1970
Juan González, 1992, 1993
Alex Rodriguez, 2001, 2002, 2003

See also
Baseball awards
List of MLB awards

Footnotes

award winners
Major League Baseball team trophies and awards